Lakehead-Lakeshore is an unincorporated community and a former census-designated place (CDP) in Shasta County, California, United States. The population was 549 at the 2000 census. It is a very seasonal town with many Shasta Lake services, including a small grocery store, Subway restaurant inside the Chevron gas station, and low-cost lodging for Shasta Lake visitors. It also has several campgrounds.

Geography
Lakehead is located at  (40.901211, -122.392325).

Demographics
As of the census of 2000, there were 549 people, 240 households, and 173 families residing in the CDP. The racial makeup of the CDP was 92.71% White, 0.18% African American, 3.64% Native American, 1.46% from other races, and 2.00% from two or more races. Hispanic or Latino of any race were 2.55% of the population.

There were 240 households, out of which 20.4% had children under the age of 18 living with them, 60.8% were married couples living together, 7.5% had a female householder with no husband present, and 27.9% were non-families. 22.9% of all households were made up of individuals, and 10.8% had someone living alone who was 65 years of age or older.  The average household size was 2.29 and the average family size was 2.63.

In the CDP, the population was spread out, with 17.7% under the age of 18, 3.6% from 18 to 24, 18.9% from 25 to 44, 35.9% from 45 to 64, and 23.9% who were 65 years of age or older.  The median age was 49 years. For every 100 females, there were 99.6 males.  For every 100 females age 18 and over, there were 98.2 males.

The median income for a household in the CDP was $31,316, and the median income for a family was $31,316. Males had a median income of $21,027 versus $38,333 for females. The per capita income for the CDP was $17,326.  About 9.4% of families and 11.8% of the population were below the poverty line, including 13.0% of those under age 18 and 13.0% of those age 65 or over.

In the summer, Lakehead can have over 1,500 seasonal residents along with the other 549 residents.

Government

References

Former census-designated places in California
Unincorporated communities in Shasta County, California
Unincorporated communities in California